Marco Brescianini (born 20 January 2000) is an Italian professional footballer who plays as a midfielder for  club Cosenza, on loan from AC Milan.

Club career

AC Milan 
Coming through the youth system, Brescianini made his first team debut for AC Milan aged 20, on 1 August 2020, replacing Ismaël Bennacer after 66 minutes in a 3−0 home win against Cagliari in the Serie A.

Loan to Virtus Entella
On 29 August 2020 he was sent to Serie B club Virtus Entella on loan until 30 June 2021.

Loan to Monza
On 10 June 2021, Brescianini joined Serie B club Monza on a one-year loan. He made his debut on 14 August, in a 2–1 Coppa Italia defeat to Cittadella in the first round.

Loan to Cosenza 
On 7 August 2022, Brescianini was loaned again, joining Serie B club Cosenza on a one-year loan.

International career 
On 7 September 2021, Brescianini made his debut with the Italy U21 squad, playing as a substitute in the qualifying match won 1–0 against Montenegro.

Career statistics

References

2000 births
Living people
People from Calcinate
Sportspeople from the Province of Bergamo
Footballers from Lombardy
Italian footballers
Italy youth international footballers
Italy under-21 international footballers
Association football midfielders
A.C. Milan players
Virtus Entella players
A.C. Monza players
Cosenza Calcio players
Serie A players
Serie B players